Goodspeed is a mobile Wi-Fi hotspot developed and produced by Uros Ltd and manufactured in Finland by Sanmina Corporation. This mobile hotspot-router is used to connect up to 5 Wi-Fi enabled clients to a private WLAN.

The Goodspeed provides Internet access for WiFi enabled peripheral devices by establishing a WPA/WPA2 secured connection between Goodspeed and any type of portable WiFi device, laptop, mobile phone, digital camera and tablet. Goodspeed accesses the local cellular network through SIM cards that are stored inside the device. The SIM cards are provided by Uros Ltd as part of the Goodspeed service. The device has the shape and size of a smartphone and a display that communicates the current status, connectivity, strength of the signal, SSID and password of the network.

Awards 

 iF product design award 2013, International Forum Design
 100 Mejores Ideas del año 2014 (One of the 100 Top Business Ideas of the Year 2014), Actualidad Económica
 Goodspeed 4G won Mobile Breakthrough Awards’ Mobile Hotspot Product of the Year, 2017

See also 

MiFi

References

External links 

 Official website

Wi-Fi providers
Mobile hotspots
Mobile telecommunications user equipment